John Henry Balch (January 2, 1896 – October 15, 1980) was a United States Naval Reserve officer. He received the Medal of Honor for his actions in World War I.

Education
Balch enlisted in the Navy in Kansas City, Missouri under an officers training program. Prior to his enlistment on May 26, 1917, he had been a student at Kansas State University. After the training program, he was assigned to the 3rd Battalion, 6th Marine Regiment and served in France during World War I.

Military service
Prior to the actions in which he was subsequently awarded the Medal of Honor, Balch was involved in the Battle of Belleau Wood where he was wounded. On October 5, 1918, he showed exceptional bravery by establishing an aid station under intense fire. Acting as a Pharmacist's Mate, he was credited with carrying wounded Marines to safety and thereby saving their lives.

On August 19, 1919, Balch received an honorable discharge as a Pharmacist's Mate First Class. One-month later he was presented the Medal of Honor by Rear Admiral F. B. Bassett at the YMCA in Chicago, Illinois. 

In September 1942, Balch rejoined the Navy as a lieutenant and served stateside as well as Australia and the Philippines before eventually retiring on June 1, 1950 from the Naval Reserve with the rank of commander and one of the most decorated sailors in US Navy history.

He is buried at Riverside National Cemetery in Riverside, California.

Medal of Honor citation
Rank and organization: Pharmacist's Mate First Class, U.S. Navy. Place and date: Vierzy, France, and Somme-Py, France, July 19, and October 5, 1918. Entered service at: Kansas City, Mo. Born: January 2, 1896, Edgerton, Kansas

Citation: 
For gallantry and intrepidity at the risk of his life above and beyond the call of duty, with the 6th Regiment, U.S. Marines, in action at Vierzy, on 19 July 1918. Balch unhesitatingly and fearlessly exposed himself to terrific machinegun and high-explosive fire to succor the wounded as they fell in the attack, leaving his dressing station voluntarily and keeping up the work all day and late into the night unceasingly for 16 hours. Also in the action at Somme-Py on 5 October 1918, he exhibited exceptional bravery in establishing an advanced dressing station under heavy shellfire.

Other decorations and awards
Distinguished Service Cross (Interservice Award from US Army)

…During the attack in the Bois-de-Belleau, Pharmacist's Mate Balch displayed conspicuous coolness under shell fire in evacuating wounded men. During the action near Vierzy, he worked unceasingly for sixteen hours, giving assistance to the wounded on a field torn by high explosive shells and covered by direct machine-gun fire. Near St. Etienne-aux-Arnes, he again gave proof of excellent judgment and courage in establishing an advance dressing station under violent shell and machine-gun fire, thereby saving many lives which would otherwise have been lost.

3 Silver Stars (Interservice Award from US Army)

Navy Commendation Medal
Purple Heart
World War I Victory Medal
American Campaign Medal
Asiatic-Pacific Campaign Medal
World War II Victory Medal

Foreign Decorations
French Croix de Guerre with Fourragère
Italian War Merit Cross: Croce al Merito di Guerra
Portuguese War Cross: Medalha da Cruz de Guerra

Legacy
On 21 July 2005, The Naval Health Clinic at Quantico, Virginia was renamed the John H. Balch Clinic.

In 2018 John Henry Balch became the subject of the short documentary John Henry Balch: Congressional Medal of Honor directed by Sreang "C" Hok, in collaboration with El Dorado Films and the Veteran Documentary Corps.

See also

List of Medal of Honor recipients
List of Medal of Honor recipients for World War I

References

External links

1896 births
1980 deaths
Burials at Riverside National Cemetery
Military personnel from Kansas
People from Johnson County, Kansas
Recipients of the Croix de Guerre 1914–1918 (France)
Recipients of the Distinguished Service Cross (United States)
Recipients of the Silver Star
United States Navy corpsmen
United States Navy Medal of Honor recipients
United States Navy officers
United States Navy personnel of World War I
United States Navy personnel of World War II
World War I recipients of the Medal of Honor